Severny is an air base in Russia located 200 km east of Orsk.  It was a 1960s-era bomber base.  The facility is mostly plowed under but 8 large pads are noted.  It is located only 3 km from the Kazakhstan border to east.

References

Soviet Air Force bases